In geometry, the elongated square gyrobicupola or pseudo-rhombicuboctahedron is one of the Johnson solids. It is not usually considered to be an Archimedean solid, even though its faces consist of regular polygons that meet in the same pattern at each of its vertices, because unlike the 13 Archimedean solids, it lacks a set of global symmetries that map every vertex to every other vertex (though Grünbaum has suggested it should be added to the traditional list of Archimedean solids as a 14th example). It strongly resembles, but should not be mistaken for, the rhombicuboctahedron, which is an Archimedean solid. It is also a canonical polyhedron.

This shape may have been discovered by Johannes Kepler in his enumeration of the Archimedean solids, but its first clear appearance in print appears to be the work of Duncan Sommerville in 1905. It was independently rediscovered by J. C. P. Miller by 1930 (by mistake while attempting to construct a model of the rhombicuboctahedron) and again by V. G. Ashkinuse in 1957.

Construction and relation to the rhombicuboctahedron 
As the name suggests, it can be constructed by elongating a square gyrobicupola (J29) and inserting an octagonal prism between its two halves. 

The solid can also be seen as the result of twisting one of the square cupolae (J4) on a rhombicuboctahedron (one of the Archimedean solids; a.k.a. the elongated square orthobicupola) by 45 degrees. It is therefore a gyrate rhombicuboctahedron. Its similarity to the rhombicuboctahedron gives it the alternative name pseudo-rhombicuboctahedron. It has occasionally been referred to as "the fourteenth Archimedean solid".

This property does not carry over to its pentagonal-faced counterpart, the gyrate rhombicosidodecahedron.

Symmetry and classification 
The pseudo-rhombicuboctahedron possesses D4d symmetry.  It is locally vertex-regular – the arrangement of the four faces incident on any vertex is the same for all vertices; this is unique among the Johnson solids. However, the manner in which it is "twisted" gives it a distinct "equator" and two distinct "poles", which in turn divide its vertices into 8 "polar" vertices (4 per pole) and 16 "equatorial" vertices. It is therefore not vertex-transitive, and consequently not usually considered to be one of the Archimedean solids.
With faces colored by its D4d symmetry, it can look like this:

There are 8 (green) squares around its equator, 4 (red) triangles and 4 (yellow) squares above and below, and one (blue) square on each pole.

Related polyhedra and honeycombs
The elongated square gyrobicupola can form a space-filling honeycomb with the regular tetrahedron, cube, and cuboctahedron. It can also form another honeycomb with the tetrahedron, square pyramid and various combinations of cubes, elongated square pyramids, and elongated square bipyramids.

The pseudo great rhombicuboctahedron is a nonconvex analog of the pseudo-rhombicuboctahedron, constructed in a similar way from the nonconvex great rhombicuboctahedron.

In chemistry
The polyvanadate ion [V18O42]12− has a pseudo-rhombicuboctahedral structure, where each square face acts as the base of a VO5 pyramid.

References

Further reading
  Chapter 2: Archimedean polyhedra, prisma and antiprisms, p. 25 Pseudo-rhombicuboctahedron

External links
 
 George Hart: pseudo-rhombicuboctahedra

Johnson solids
Pseudo-uniform polyhedra